Raoul Laparra (13 May 1876 – 4 April 1943) was a French composer.

Life
Born in Bordeaux, Laparra studied at the Conservatoire de Paris with André Gedalge, Jules Massenet, Gabriel Fauré and Albert Lavignac. In 1903 he won the Premier Grand Prix de Rome with his cantata Alyssa.

Laparra worked as a music critic for the magazines Le Ménestrel and Le Matin and taught at the Conservatoire de Paris. Among his students were Claude Champagne and Cemal Reşit Rey. His compositions are often influenced by Spanish and Basque folk music.

He remains one of the masters of French Hispanism without remaining locked up in this speciality.

He was the brother of the painter William Laparra. He died during the bombing of Boulogne-Billancourt in 1943 and is buried in Chézy-sur-Marne.

Selected works
 Peau d'âne, Opera, 1899
 La Habanera, Drame lyrique, 1900–1903
 Amphitryon, stage music for the play by Molière, 1904–1907
 La Jota, Conte lyrique, 1908–1911
 Suite ancienne en marge de Don Quichotte for violin or viola and piano, 1921
 Le Joueur de viole, Conte lyrique, 1925
 Le Livre de l'aurore, Suite for flute and piano, 1926
 Las Toreras, Zarzuela after Tirso de Molina, 1929
 L'Illustre Frégona, Zarzuela based on Miguel de Cervantes, 1931

Bibliography
 Stéphan Etcharry, articles in Carlos Alvar, Gran Enciclopedia Cervantina, 10 volumes (Madrid: University of Alcalá, Centro de Estudios Cervantinos, Castalia editorial S. A., 2005), .
 L'Illustre Fregona (Raoul Laparra)
 Suite ancienne en marge de Don Quichotte (Raoul Laparra)
 Stéphan Etcharry, Le Prix de Rome de composition de 1903: La cantate Alyssa de Raoul Laparra. Essai de caractérisation du style musical, in Musiker. Cuadernos de Música, no. 16 (Donostia, Saint-Sébastien: Eusko Ikaskuntza [Société d'Études Basques], 2008), .
 Stéphan Etcharry, "'La Jota' (1911) à l'Opéra-Comique: LEspagne noire' de Raoul Laparra", in: Alexandre Dratwicki and Agnès Terrier (eds), Exotisme et art lyrique (Paris/Venice: Opéra-Comique/Palazzetto Bru Zane, Centre de musique romantique française, June 2012), published online on 26 September 2016, p. 1-27, [bruzanemediabase.com : http://www.bruzanemediabase.com/Parutions-scientifiques-en-ligne/Articles/Etcharry-Stephan-La-Jota-1911-a-l-Opera-Comique.-L-Espagne-noire-de-Raoul-Laparra/(offset)/2].
 Samuel Llano, Whose Spain? Negotiating Spanish music in Paris, 1908–1929'' (New York: Oxford University Press, 2013).

References

External links
 Laparra on IMSLP
 Raoul Laparra on Naxos
 Raoul Laparra (1876 - 1943) on UR research
 Vanni Marcoux, Et c'est à moi que l'on dit chante, Laparra La habanera (YouTube)

1876 births
1943 deaths
19th-century French male musicians
20th-century classical composers
20th-century French composers
20th-century French male musicians
Academic staff of the Conservatoire de Paris
Conservatoire de Paris alumni
French male composers
French music critics
French opera composers
French Romantic composers
Male opera composers
Musicians from Bordeaux
Prix de Rome for composition